The 14th Central American and Caribbean Junior Championships were held in the Estadio Sixto Escobar in San Juan, Puerto Rico between 14–16 July 2000.

Records
A total of 15 new championship records were set.  The wind-assisted mark of 8.09 m (2.9 m/s) by Cleavon Dillon from Trinidad and Tobago was the best performance in long jump of the Male Junior A (U-20) category, as was the mark of 13.30 s (4.8 m/s) by Toni Ann D'Oyley from Jamaica
in 100 metres hurdles of the Female Junior A (U-20) category, the mark of 21.46 s (2.4 m/s) by Darrel Brown from Trinidad and Tobago in 200 metres of the Male Junior B (U-17) category, the mark of 7.35 m (5.1 m/s) by Damion Young from Jamaica in long jump of the Male Junior B (U-17) category, and the mark of 6.17m  (3.4 m/s) by Charisse Bacchus from Trinidad and Tobago in long jump of the Female Junior B (U-17) category,
but all five could not be recognized as new records.
 

Key

Medal summary

Complete results are published on a day by day basis, and medal winners are published by category: Junior A, Male, Junior A, Female, and Junior B.

Male Junior A (under 20)

Female Junior A (under 20)

Male Junior B (under 17)

Female Junior B (under 17)

Medal table

*:There is a mismatch between the unofficial medal count and the published medal
count above. The unofficial count results in only 3 gold medals for both the
Bahamas and Puerto Rico, only 13 silver medals for Puerto Rico, no silver or
any other medal for Saint Lucia, and only 7 bronze medals for Mexico and only
2 bronze medals for Barbados.  This could be explained by 
published results being incomplete.  In the technical manual the events 2000 metres steeplechase in the Girls under 20 (Junior) category and
Octathlon in the Boys under 17 (Youth) category were scheduled, but 
no results could be found.  Assuming that the published medal tables are
correct,  and working through the published medal
count, the following result could tentatively be assigned:  2000 metres
steeplechase girls (U-20): gold for Puerto Rico, silver for Puerto Rico, and
bronze for Barbados, octathlon boys (U-17): gold for the Bahamas, silver for
Saint Lucia, and bronze for Mexico.  The number of events would increase to 82.

Participation (unofficial)

Haiti competed for the first time at the championships. Detailed result lists can be found on the World Junior Athletics History website.  An unofficial count yields a number of about 422 athletes (260 junior (under-20) and 162 youth (under-17)) from about 31 countries, a new record number of participating nations:

 (3)
 (1)
 (4)
 (23)
 (23)
 (6)
 (1)
 (8)
 (4)
 (2)
 (1)
 (11)
 (8)
 (12)
 (10)
 (2)
 (2)
 (70)
 México (42)
 (9)
 (1)
 (8)
 (88)
 (3)
 (2)
 (2)
 (2)
 (40)
 (2)
 (7)
 (25)

References

External links
Official CACAC Website
Local Championships Website
World Junior Athletics History

Central American and Caribbean Junior Championships in Athletics
2000 in Puerto Rican sports
Central American and Caribbean Junior Championships
Athl
Athl
International athletics competitions hosted by Puerto Rico
2000 in youth sport